Robert John Wilson (born September 3, 1944 in San Francisco, California) was a candidate for the Republican nomination for District 2 of the Arizona State Senate. He was defeated by his opponent Shelley Kais in the August 28, 2018 Republican primary election.

Wilson told the Associated Press that in 1963 he fatally shot his mother, in self-defense.

Wilson is a retired lawyer.

Court records list Wilson's surname as "Wiste", as does the California Birth Index.

Publications
Wilson has written five books:
 
 
 
 
 

Apache Publishing Company is operated by Wilson's wife Eileen Marie Wilson in Sahuarita, Arizona.

References

External links
 
 
 Bobby Wilson (Arizona) in Ballotpedia
 Arizona State Senate District 2 in Ballotpedia
 Arizona State Senate elections, 2018 in Ballotpedia

Living people
1940s births
Arizona lawyers
Arizona Republicans
21st-century American politicians
People from San Francisco
University of Texas at Arlington alumni
Texas Tech University School of Law alumni